Kuala Lumpur Football Association, also known as Kuala Lumpur FA or simply KLFA, is a state football association that supervises the football activities in the Federal Territory of Malaysia of Kuala Lumpur. The association was formed in 1975.

History

Kuala Lumpur Football Association (KLFA) was formed in 1975 as Federal Territory Football Association (FTFA) with Hamzah Abu Samah elected as their first president. The association was actually a breakaway group from the FA Selangor. Led by former FA of Selangor, secretary K. Rasalingam, together with Goh Ah Chai, Hamzah Muhammad, M.J. Vincent, Shariff Mustafa, Jeswant Singh and Manickarajah, they saw the need for another association in the Klang Valley due to the growing numbers of clubs. Hamzah went on to become the F.A. of Malaysia president in 1977 and FTFA deputy president Tengku Ahmad Rithauddeen took over at the helm. It was that year too that FTFA organised their first league with thirty clubs. Then it was just one division with the clubs being divided into the Dunhill League, Bandaraya (City) League, First Division, Second Division, Third Division, Reserve League and Government Departments and Business House League.

The following year, FTFA was represented at the national level for the first time when they competed in the Razak Cup (under-18). It was in 1979 that the Federal Territory made their debut in the Malaysia Cup. In 1984, Tengku Ahmad Rithauddeen stepped down as president and the Lord Mayor, Elyas Omar was elected the third president of the association.

FTFA officially changed its name to Kuala Lumpur Football Association (KLFA) in 1987 to better identify itself with the city.

Leadership in the KLFA kept changing after Elyas bin Omar stepped down with Megat Junid Megat Ayub taking over. At the 2014 congress, Astaman Abdul Aziz stepped down and the Federal Territories Ministry secretary general Adnan Md Ikhsan was elected the president while Astaman and Izudin Ishak became the deputy presidents.

Kuala Lumpur Association is also known internationally for having hosted the Inter-City Tournament for several years. Among the participating countries were Czechoslovakia, England, Austria, Australia, Germany, Turkey and Indonesia.

At present about 70 clubs are affiliated members of the KLFA and are currently competing in the KL League and FA Cup. These clubs are divided into three divisions namely the Premier, Division 1, and Division 2.

Presidents
1975–1977: Hamzah Abu Samah
1977–1984: Tengku Ahmad Rithauddeen Tengku Ismail
1984–?: Elyas Omar
?–1998: Megat Junid Megat Ayub
1998–2014: Astaman Abdul Aziz
2014–2019: Adnan Md Ikhsan
2019–present: Khalid Abdul Samad

KLFA Academy Football Centre
KLFA Academy Football Centre is the training ground and academy base of the Football Association of Malaysia, located in Kuala Lumpur. It is located in the township of Taman Melawati and covers 3.28 hectares. It is also the main headquarters for the Kuala Lumpur Football Association. The facility was founded by the Kuala Lumpur Football Association to serve as the team's main training ground and also serves as an academy for the Kuala Lumpur football teams. The facility also serves as a meeting point and has a futsal court, a gymnasium, a cafeteria and dormitories for the youth players. The RM5.4 million academy opened in March 2012.

Football competitions managed by the Association
 KLFA Division 1 League
 KLFA FA Cup

References

External links
Official website

1975 establishments in Malaysia
Football associations in Malaysia
Sports organizations established in 1975